Play was a Chinese game-and-software oriented magazine founded in October 1993 and first officially published in June 1994 by Popular Science Press (科学普及出版社; Kēxué Pŭjí Chūbănshè). The magazine was originally named Jiāyòng Diànnǎo Yǔ Yóuxìjī (家用电脑与游戏机; lit. "Home Computer and Game Console"), and focused on both PC games and console games. In January 2001 it was renamed to its current name and its coverage shifted to focus on PC games exclusively, making it the first specialized PC gaming magazine in China. Subsequently Play became one of the most important gaming magazines in mainland China.

In October 2013, a tweet from Play'''s official microblog, announced that the November-December issue (Issue #231) would be released as a combined issue with a farewell-like statement.Official microblog announcement. Sina Weibo. 8 October 2013 According to Gamersky.com, the stoppage in publishing came due to both human and environmental factor: Reader preference for quantity rather than quality of information; Too much advertisement content; The increased role of internet-based video game journalism; and a general lack of a distinctive character. Following only one year after the closure of the prominent journal Diànzǐ Yóuxì Ruǎnjiàn, the shutdown of Play after nearly 20 years of continual publication has been regarded in context with the earlier shutdown of big-name Western magazines like Electronic Gaming Monthly, GamePro, and Nintendo Power as an example of the global nature of the decline in printed publications.

Historical timeline
October 1993 - State Science and Technology Commission approves the founding of Jiāyòng Diànnǎo Yǔ Yóuxìjī (家用电脑与游戏机; lit. "Home Computer and Game Console") as a Popular Science Press publication.
June 1994 - The magazine's premier issue is released and publications continue bi-monthly.
January 1995 - Release schedules are increased to make the magazine a monthly publication, and growing circulation figures place the publication among the top 10 most widely read Chinese periodicals.
January 2001 - The magazine is renamed to Jiāyòng Diànnǎo Yǔ Yóuxì (家用电脑与游戏; lit. "Home Computer Game") and shifts emphasis solely to the PC game market. At this point it also adopts its English moniker, Play''.
January 2002 - The magazine becomes a full-color publication.
2003 - The magazine is honored by GAPP who award it prestigious Jin Ling Awards for Best Game-Related Media and Chinese Game Industry's Most Influential annual game-related media. The magazine is subsequently granted exhibition space at the prestigious ChinaJoy conference.
October 2013 - The magazine announced its final issue for November-December 2013.

References

External links
  

1994 establishments in China
2013 disestablishments in China
Chinese-language magazines
Defunct computer magazines
Defunct magazines published in China
Home computer magazines
Magazines established in 1994
Magazines disestablished in 2013
Magazines published in Beijing
Video game magazines published in China